This is the Uttar Pradesh Council of Ministers headed by the Chief Minister of Uttar Pradesh, Mulayam Singh Yadav from 2003 to 2007.

Council of ministers

Cabinet Ministers

Ministers of State

References

Mulayam III
2003 establishments in Uttar Pradesh
Cabinets established in 2003
Samajwadi Party
Cabinets disestablished in 2007
2007 disestablishments in India